Gail Michelle Prescod (born 12 August 1971) is a Vincentian sprinter who competed at the 1992 Summer Olympics in Barcelona, Spain.

Prescod competed in the 100 metres at the 1992 Summer Olympics, she ran the distance in 12.41 seconds and came last in her heat but finished 48th out of the 54 starters.

References

1971 births
Living people
Saint Vincent and the Grenadines female sprinters
Olympic athletes of Saint Vincent and the Grenadines
Athletes (track and field) at the 1992 Summer Olympics
Place of birth missing (living people)
Olympic female sprinters